Jaroslav Galko (born 7 January 1961) is a former football player from Slovakia and currently manager of Partizán Bardejov.

References

External links
 MFK Košice profile

External links

1961 births
Living people
Slovak footballers
Slovak football managers
Association football forwards
FC VSS Košice managers
FC Lokomotíva Košice managers
1. FC Tatran Prešov players
ŠK Futura Humenné players
FC VSS Košice players
Slovak Super Liga players
Expatriate footballers in Austria
Sportspeople from Prešov